The ISME Journal: Multidisciplinary Journal of Microbial Ecology is a peer-reviewed scientific journal that covers diverse and integrated areas of microbial ecology spanning the breadth of microbial life, including bacteria, archaea, microbial eukaryotes, and viruses. It is an official publication of the International Society for Microbial Ecology (ISME) and publishes original research articles, reviews, and commentaries. The founding editors-in-chief are Mark Bailey and George Kowalchuk. The journal is published on behalf of ISME by the Nature Publishing Group.

According to the Journal Citation Reports published in 2021, the journal had an impact factor of 10.302. The SCImago Journal Rank placed the ISME Journal 9th out of 152 journals in the category "Microbiology" and 11th out of 658 journals in the category "Ecology, Evolution, Behavior and Systematics".

References

External links 
 

Ecology journals
Microbiology journals
Publications established in 2007
Nature Research academic journals
Monthly journals
English-language journals
Academic journals associated with learned and professional societies